BFW may refer to:

 Bayerische Flugzeugwerke AG, later Messerschmitt AG, German aircraft manufacturer
 Bleed from Within, Scottish heavy metal band
 Boiler feedwater